The Sihuas Province (Quechua Siwas) is one of twenty provinces of the Ancash Region in Peru.This province was created by Law nº 13485, dated at January 9 of 1961, when was president of Perou: Manuel Prado.  It is bordered by provinces of Huaylas and Corongo on the west, Pallasca Province on the north, La Libertad Region on the east, and Pomabamba Province on the south.

Geography 
Other mountains are listed below:

Political division
Sihuas is divided into ten districts, which are:

 Acobamba 
 Alfonso Ugarte 
 Cashapampa 
 Chingalpo 
 Huayllabamba 
 Quiches 
 Ragash 
 San Juan 
 Sicsibamba 
 Sihuas

Ethnic groups 
The province is inhabited by indigenous citizens of Quechua descent. Spanish is the language which the majority of the population (62.89%) learnt to speak in childhood, 36.83% of the residents started speaking using the Quechua language (2007 Peru Census).

Earthquake of November 10, 1946
On November 10, 1946, a magnitude 7.3 earthquake struck the province.  The epicenter is estimated to have occurred at 8°20' S. 77°50' W. at a depth of 30 – 40 km. The surface fault was observed to run about 18 km northwest from Quiches toward Conchucos.  The quake was "the first well-observed instance of major faulting." The fault was purely slip-dip (vertical), with an offset of as much as 3.5 meters (11 feet).  The quake and resulting landslides resulted in a death toll estimated at 1400 - 1700, a substantial number given the sparse population in the area.  The village of Acobamba was buried by one landslide, killing 217.

Main events
 January: Anniversary Province 
 August: Our Lady of the Snow 
 October: Lord of Miracles

References

Sources
Historic Earthquakes
Alexander E. Gates and David Ritchie, Encyclopedia of Earthquakes and Volcanoes, Third Ed. (New York, Facts on File, Inc. 2007) p. 10 available at Scribd

External links
  Municipal web site

Provinces of the Ancash Region